Hummingbird (released as Redemption in the United States) is a 2013 British action crime film written and directed by Steven Knight, in his feature film directorial debut. It stars Jason Statham as an alcoholic veteran haunted by his war crimes; he befriends a Catholic nun, becomes involved in organised crime, and takes revenge on a man who beats and kills prostitutes.

Plot

Joseph Smith, a fugitive ex-Special Forces soldier and a homeless drunk in London, is attacked by a group of thugs one night, and he breaks into an apartment to escape them. Learning that the owner, a successful photographer named Damon, is away for the next 8 months until October, Joseph starts squatting there and assumes a new identity, calling himself Joey Jones and using Damon's resources while looking for his homeless friend Isabel who has been coerced into becoming a prostitute by the same gang that attacked him. Joseph is friend with Sister Cristina, a Polish nun who runs the local soup kitchen, who gives him information about Isabel's whereabouts. To deflect the suspicion of Damon's neighbors, he tells them that he is Damon's boyfriend and starts working at a Chinese restaurant. One night at work, Joseph fights off some rowdy diners outside the restaurant, impressing senior manager Mr. Choy. Choy, who is connected to a Chinese organised crime syndicate, hires Joseph as a driver and enforcer. Joseph uses the money he receives to buy food for the homeless at the soup kitchen and gifts for Cristina. He also encounters Dawn, his ex-lover and mother of his young daughter. As Joseph appears well-dressed, she attacks him for not helping out when she and their daughter were struggling financially, but calms down when Joseph gives her a large amount of money as an apology.

Joseph eventually learns from Cristina that Isabel was murdered; enraged, he confronts the same thugs who attacked him earlier, and acquires a rough description of the killer. In order to pass the information on to Cristina, Joseph invites her to an art gallery where she gets drunk, opens up to him and reveals she used the money given by him to buy tickets for a ballet set to happen on the same date as Damon's scheduled return. While driving her home, Joseph learns that she was sexually abused by her gymnastics instructor as a child, and that she eventually murdered him, but due to her age at the time, she was sentenced to a convent instead of a prison. Feeling distracted due to her relationship with Joseph, she asks for a transfer to Africa. Meanwhile, Mr. Choy's boss, Madame Choy, helps Joseph track down the killer in exchange for driving a truck containing people being smuggled into the UK. Joseph finds out about the killer named Max Forrester, a man who assaults prostitutes, through an invitation to a rooftop cocktail party.

Cristina tells Joseph that she will soon leave for Africa, and the two consummate their relationship as Damon returns. After escaping, Joseph delivers a bag full of money to Dawn along with his photos, and goes to the rooftop cocktail party where he kills Max by throwing him off the building. Joseph runs away and is found asleep near a curb by Cristina. Upon waking, Joseph reveals that he is on the run from a court martial for random revenge killings he carried out in Afghanistan for the deaths of his men, who were slaughtered in front of him. He often has random hallucinations of the men he killed and of "hummingbirds", the aerial drones in Afghanistan. The next day, Cristina receives a note from Joseph, revealing he has paid his debts to everyone including Damon, has informed the police about Mr. Choy's human trafficking operation, and would now disappear into the streets once again. As a drunk Joseph walks into the streets, he is pursued by the police with the help of drones similar to the "hummingbird".

Cast

Production

Hummingbird was almost entirely filmed at night. Filming sites included popular streets for homeless people, some of whom were involved in the shoot. Statham stated that before filming started some research was undertaken into the mental health issues of his character, including ex-servicemen asked about their experiences.

The Dartford Crossing is featured in Hummingbird twice – when Joey drives a van across the bridge and when a lorry approaches the toll. The area around the Covent Garden Market was featured in several scenes. Among the buildings used was St Paul's and Royal Opera House.

The sound track features "Malka Moma", a Bulgarian folk style song, with lyrics and music by Neli Andreeva and Georgi Genov. The song is performed by the Bulgarian National Folk Ensemble "Philip Koutev". Neli Andreeva, choirmaster with the ensemble, is the soloist.

Release
Hummingbird was released in the United Kingdom, the United States (as Redemption), France (as Crazy Joe) and in Germany (as Redemption - Stunde der Vergeltung) on 28 June 2013.

Reception

Based on 51 reviews, Rotten Tomatoes gives a score of 49% with an average rating of 5.3/10. The site's critical consensus reads, "While it certainly has more on its mind than the average Jason Statham action thriller, Redemption doesn't quite capitalize on its premise – or on its star's strong, committed performance." On Metacritic, the film has a weighted average score of 43 out of 100 based on 14 critics, indicating "mixed or average reviews".

See also
 List of films featuring drones

References

External links
 
 
 
 

2013 films
2013 action drama films
2013 independent films
British independent films
British action drama films
2010s English-language films
Drone films
Films scored by Dario Marianelli
Films about homelessness
Films set in London
Films shot in Kent
Films shot in London
IM Global films
Films with screenplays by Steven Knight
Films directed by Steven Knight
2013 directorial debut films
2010s British films